State Route 195 (SR 195) is a 7.6 mile long east-west state highway in Fayette County, Tennessee. It connects Macon with Somerville, as well as providing access to Fayette County Airport.

Route description

SR 195 begins just east of Macon at a Y-intersection with SR 193. It heads northeast through farmland and wooded areas to have an intersection with Teague Store Road before passing by Wesley Church. The highway then turns east to have an intersection with Airport Road, the access road into Fayette County Airport. SR 195 then turns northeast again through more wooded areas to cross a bridge over a creek before it enters Somerville, where it passes through some neighborhoods before coming to an end at a Y-intersection with SR 76 just south of downtown. The entire route of SR 195 is a two-lane highway.

Major intersections

References

195
Transportation in Fayette County, Tennessee